Dublin Bay North is a parliamentary constituency that has been represented in Dáil Éireann, the lower house of the Irish parliament or Oireachtas, from the 2016 general election. The constituency elects 5 deputies (Teachtaí Dála, commonly known as TDs). The method of election is proportional representation by means of the single transferable vote (PR-STV).

History and boundaries
The Constituency Commission proposed in its 2012 report that at the next general election a new constituency called Dublin Bay North be created. The report proposed changes to the constituencies of Ireland so as to reduce the total number of TDs from 166 to 158.

The constituency was established by the Electoral (Amendment) (Dáil Constituencies) Act 2013. It incorporates the entirety of Dublin North-Central and most of Dublin North-East; with the transfer of an area around the village of Portmarnock from Dublin North-East into Dublin Fingal.

The Electoral (Amendment) (Dáil Constituencies) Act 2017 defines the constituency as:

TDs

Elections

2020 general election

2016 general election
The constituency was dubbed the "group of death" by media because of the large number and high profile of candidates, the close contest, and the protracted nature of the count.

See also
Elections in the Republic of Ireland
Politics of the Republic of Ireland
List of Dáil by-elections
List of political parties in the Republic of Ireland

References

External links
 Oireachtas Constituency Dashboards
 Oireachtas Members Database

Dáil constituencies
Politics of Dublin (city)
Politics of Fingal
Parliamentary constituencies in County Dublin
2016 establishments in Ireland
Constituencies established in 2016
Clontarf, Dublin
Howth
Raheny
Sutton, Dublin